Rebecca Dunham is a contemporary American poet. Her work has been described as post-Confessional and concerns itself with feminist and ecological issues. Dunham's lyric poetry is distinguished by its use of extended poetic sequences, its interrogation of the persona as artifice, as well as grounding itself frequently in accounts of women's lives.

Background
Originally from Maine, Dunham resides in Madison, Wisconsin. She is currently a professor of English at the University of Wisconsin-Milwaukee. Her poetry has been featured in AGNI, Prairie Schooner, Indiana Review, The Antioch Review, Kenyon Review, and FIELD.

Awards and honors
 Arts and Letters Distinguished Visiting Writing, Bowling Green State University, Spring 2014
 Lindquist & Vennum Poetry Prize, 2013
National Endowment for the Arts Fellowship in Poetry, 2007
 T. S. Eliot Prize for poetry collection The Miniature Room, 2006.
 Jay C. and Ruth Halls Fellow in Poetry, University of Wisconsin-Madison, 2005-2006
 Indiana Review Poetry Prize, 2005

Books
 Cold Pastoral (Milkweed Editions, 2017)
 Glass Armonica (Milkweed Editions, 2013)
 Fascicle (Dancing Girl Press, 2012)
 The Flight Cage (Tupelo Press, 2010)
 The Miniature Room (Truman State University Press, 2006)

References

External links 
 Author's website
 Dunham's profile at the University of Wisconsin-Milwaukee Website
 Dunham's profile at The Poetry Foundation
 Poem video from PBS
 Poem: Glass Armonica, So to Speak Volume 22 No. 1

Living people
American women poets
University of Wisconsin–Milwaukee faculty
Poets from Maine
Poets from Wisconsin
Year of birth missing (living people)
American women academics
21st-century American women